Danila Sergeevich Izotov (born 2 October 1991) is a Russian swimmer, a member of the Russian National team since 2008, and a multiple medalist at the Olympic Games and World Championships, as well as a European champion. He is coached by his father, Sergey Alexandrovich Izotov. He is the nephew of soviet swimmer Elvira Vasilkova.

Career
Izotov made his debut in the Russian national team at the 2007 European Youth Olympic Festival in Belgrade, Serbia, where he won four gold medals – 100 m, 200 m, 400 m freestyle and 4×100 mixed relay.

Izotov won a silver medal at the 2008 Olympic Games in Beijing in the 4 × 200 m freestyle relay together with Alexander Sukhorukov, Yevgeny Lagunov and Nikita Lobintsev.  That year, he also won the men's 200 m freestyle at the European Short Course Championships.

In 2009, he set a world record in the 4 × 100 m medley in short swimming pools of 3:19.16 in St. Petersburg. At the 2009 World Championships in Rome he was the only Russian individual medalist – a bronze in the 200 m freestyle. Besides he swam the third laps in the finals of 4×100 and 4 × 200 m relay races; the Russians won the silver medal in both events, setting national records and an area record in the case of the  relay.  That year, he also set the Russian record in the short course 200 m freestyle while winning a silver at the European Short Course Championships, alongside another silver in the 100 m.

In 2010, he was part of the Russian team that set the world record in the short course men's  freestyle, while winning the World title, along with (Lobinstsev, Lagunov and Sukhorukov). At the World Championships, he also won a silver in the  freestyle and an individual silver medal in the 200 m freestyle. That year, he was also part of the 4 x 50 metre freestyle team and the 4 x 50 metre medley relay that won European short course bronze, alongside individual gold medals in the 100 and 200 m freestyle.

At the 2012 London Olympics, Izotov along with teammates (Andrey Grechin, Nikita Lobintsev, Vladimir Morozov) won Russia the bronze medal in the men's 4 × 100 m freestyle.

At the 2013 World Championships, he again won an individual bronze in the 200 m freestyle, while helping Russia win silver in the men's  freestyle relay and bronze in the  freestyle relay.  He also won gold in the 200 m freestyle at the European Short Course Championships, along with a silver in the 100 m.

In 2014, Izotov was part of the Russian  freestyle team that won silver at the World Short Course Swimming Championships, along with individual silver in the men's 200 m freestyle and a bronze medal in the men's 100 m freestyle.

He won another team silver at the 2015 World Championship, in the men's  freestyle relay.  In 2017, there was another World Championship silver, this time in the  freestyle relay, along with a bronze in the men's  medley relay.

He competed in the 2016 Olympics, in the Russian teams that finished in 4th in the  freestyle relay and 5th in the  freestyle relay.

At the 2018 European Championships, he won one medal of each colour, gold in men's  freestyle relay, silver in the men's  freestyle relay, and bronze in the mixed  freestyle relay.

Education
Izotov is a student of the Institute of Physical Culture, Ural State Pedagogical University (USPU) Yekaterinburg.

Awards and titles
Honoured Master of Sports of Russian Federation.

The medal of order for the merits before the motherland of the 2nd degree – for the valuable contribution in the development of physical culture and sport, high sports achievements on the XXIX Olympic Games of 2008 in Beijing (2009).

Notes
1. The decree of the President of Russian Federation from 2 August 2009 N885 “ about state awarding of Russian Federation

References

External links

Danila Izotov at russwimming.ru 
Danila Izotov at the-sports.org

1991 births
Living people
People from Novouralsk
Russian male freestyle swimmers
Olympic swimmers of Russia
Olympic silver medalists for Russia
Olympic bronze medalists for Russia
Swimmers at the 2008 Summer Olympics
World record holders in swimming
Olympic bronze medalists in swimming
World Aquatics Championships medalists in swimming
Swimmers at the 2012 Summer Olympics
Swimmers at the 2016 Summer Olympics
Medalists at the FINA World Swimming Championships (25 m)
European Aquatics Championships medalists in swimming
Medalists at the 2012 Summer Olympics
Medalists at the 2008 Summer Olympics
Olympic silver medalists in swimming
Universiade medalists in swimming
Universiade gold medalists for Russia
Medalists at the 2013 Summer Universiade
Sportspeople from Sverdlovsk Oblast
20th-century Russian people
21st-century Russian people